Ross Chisholm (born 19 October 1990 in Cuckfield, England), is an English professional rugby union player for Harlequins in the Gallagher Premiership. He is a Fullback, also playing on the Wing.

Background
Chisholm started playing rugby at Haywards Heath RFC, his talent earning him a place in Harlequins Elite Player Development Group and then promotion to the senior Academy. He was selected to play in two senior pre-season matches in 2009 before making his first team debut later that year against Newcastle Falcons in the LV Cup. He continued developing and in January 2011 signed his first senior contract.

Club career
The 2011–12 season saw Chisholm make his first Premiership start in the opener against London Irish, playing on the wing. The constant presence of Mike Brown at Fullback and stiff competition on the wings limited Chisholm's first team game time, but he did make 11 senior appearances (including 4 Premiership starts) in the season, scoring 5 tries. His last try was scored in the dying moments of an away loss against Gloucester (his second that match), it secured Quins a losing bonus point and Chisholm a nomination for RPA 'Try of the Year'.

His development has severely hampered by serious injuries which have limited his chances to play for the 1st XV

Chisholm made a strong come back in the 2015–16 season, he scored two tries in front of 70,718 crowd at Twickenham Stadium in the Big Game 9 fixture against Gluocester.
 
Alongside with his playing career, Chisholm was appointed a coaching role with the Sussex Rugby in March 2017 as the side returns to the County Rugby Championship for the first time in four years.

On 26 April 2017, it was announced that Chisholm re-signed for Harlequins.

References

External links
Harlequins profile
ESPN Profile

1990 births
Living people
English rugby union players
Harlequin F.C. players
Rugby union players from Cuckfield
Rugby union wings